Francis Lynn (19 May 1929 – 2011) was an English professional footballer who played as a winger.

References

1929 births
2011 deaths
Sportspeople from Consett
Footballers from County Durham
English footballers
Association football wingers
Blackhall Colliery Welfare F.C. players
Grimsby Town F.C. players
English Football League players